Bread is a 1918 American silent drama film directed by Ida May Park and starring Mary MacLaren, Edward Cecil and Kenneth Harlan.

In 2020, the film was selected for preservation in the United States National Film Registry by the Library of Congress as being "culturally, historically, or aesthetically significant".

Cast
 Mary MacLaren as 	Candace Newby
 Kenneth Harlan as Dick Frothingham
 Edward Cecil as Arnold Train
 Gladys Fox as Estelle Payne
 Louis Morrison as Emil Krause

References

Bibliography
 Donna Kornhaber. Silent Film: a Very Short Introduction. Oxford University Press, 2020.

External links
 

1918 films
1918 drama films
1910s English-language films
American silent feature films
Silent American drama films
American black-and-white films
Films directed by Ida May Park
Universal Pictures films
United States National Film Registry films
1910s American films